Chris Webber (born December 4, 1972) is a Canadian former professional basketball player, most notable for his career in the British Basketball League.

Career
Born in Owen Sound, Ontario, Webber's career began in 1992–93 with the Carleton University Ravens, where he won the Rookie of the Year title for Ontario-East. Webber transferred to his home-town University of Western Ontario for second year.  As a student of the University of Western Ontario, Webber played with the senior basketball team, the Western Ontario Mustangs, where he was named to the OUAA Conference 1st Team's for 1995–96 and 1996–97.

In October 1998, the 6'9 forward signed a professional contract with British Basketball League (BBL) outfit Newcastle Eagles, however he was released after just one month at the club and subsequently joined in November Plymouth Raiders to replace Daniel Okonkwo who was in Greece representing Nigeria in the 1998 FIBA World Championship.

Following Okonkwo's return, Webber was then signed by BBL franchise Leicester City Riders, making his debut on December 12 at home to London Towers. Having moved on again to Birmingham Bullets and then returned to Newcastle the following season, Webber eventually settled with Edinburgh Rocks in 2000, before ending a two-year spell to play for Gymnastikos S. Larissas in Greece. After just one season, Webber returned to the BBL and to former club Leicester, where he saw out one final season.

Chris Webber is currently a gym instructor at Newton's Grove School in Mississauga, Ontario.

Career history
2003–2004  Leicester Riders
2002–2003  Gymnastikos S. Larissas
2000–2002  Edinburgh Rocks
1999–2000  Newcastle Eagles
1998–1999  Birmingham Bullets
1998  Leicester City Riders
1998  Plymouth Raiders
1998  Newcastle Eagles
 Western Ontario Mustangs

References

External links 
basketpedya.com

1972 births
Living people
Basketball people from Ontario
Canadian expatriate basketball people in Greece
Canadian expatriate sportspeople in England
Canadian men's basketball players
Carleton Ravens basketball players
Gymnastikos S. Larissas B.C. players
Leicester Riders players
Newcastle Eagles players
Plymouth Raiders players
Sportspeople from Owen Sound
Western Mustangs basketball players
Forwards (basketball)